The Jabalpur–Mumbai Garib Rath Express is a tri-weekly AC-Train service offered by West Central Railway, Which is running between Jabalpur in eastern Madhya Pradesh and Mumbai CST in Mumbai, Maharashtra.

Number and nomenclature
The numbers provided for JABALPUR GARIB RATH EXPRESS are 12187 (Jabalpur–Mumbai) and 12188 (Mumbai– Jabalpur)

These train numbers were earlier referred for Rewanchal Express which was used to go via  in Madhya Pradesh. Later on the train via Itarsi was cancelled and the number was allotted for JABALPUR GARIB RATH EXPRESS.

The name itself signifies the meaning – The Poor Chariot. The service was introduced and extension was proposed by Lalu Prasad Yadav (former railway minister) in year 2008 without its inauguration. Later it was inaugurated in year 2009 and again its extension until Allahabad was announced in Rail Budget 2010 but it is not yet implemented due to violent protest against the extension at Jabalpur.

Locomotive and coach composition 
This train is hauled by -based WAP-4 or -based WAP-7 electric locomotive from Jabalpur to Mumbai CSMT.
The train has 18 coaches and most of them are of AC 3 TIER.

Route and halts
The train is running on the –Khandwa–Bhusawal route. The train travels at a speed of 64 km/hr and makes 13 stoppages during the journey with Bhusawal Junction being the main stop where there is a halt of 15 minutes:
 Jabalpur
 Narsinghpur
 
 
 
 Harda
 Khandwa
 
 
 
 
 Igatpuri
 
 Dadar
 Mumbai CST

References

 Garibrath Express Announced between JBP - MCST
 Indian Railways

External links
Jabalpur–Mumbai Garibrath Express Time Table
Violent Protest Against Extension to Allahabad
Derailment near Kalyan, Mumbai 
MP HC's notice against BJP MP for damaging railway property

Garib Rath Express trains
Rail transport in Madhya Pradesh
Railway services introduced in 2009
Transport in Jabalpur
Transport in Mumbai
Rail transport in Maharashtra